The Bangi-Putrajaya Expressway (BPE) is a new expressway under planning in Klang Valley, Malaysia. The  expressway connects Seri Kembangan, Kinrara, and Putrajaya. There are two sections of the expressway: the Kinrara-Putrajaya Section and Seri Kembangan.

The kilometre marker for the expressway is a continuation from the Kinrara–Damansara Expressway (now Petaling Jaya Dispersal Link Expressway)

History
The proposed BPE is an intra-urban expressway completing the "missing links" to the planned and existing expressway and highway networks within the Greater Kuala Lumpur. Integrating with the proposed Kinrara–Damansara Expressway (KIDEX) (now Petaling Jaya Dispersal Link Expressway) at Kinrara, the SKIP-KIDEX expressway will complement the intra-urban expressway network to service the travel desire route between the North and North-Eastern sector such as Damansara and Ampang and the South-Eastern sector such as Serdang, Kinrara, Putrajaya/Cyberjaya and Kuala Lumpur International Airport (KLIA) areas.

The project for the Serdang–Kinrara–Putrajaya Expressway was awarded by the Putrajaya Perdana Berhad (PPB), a company of construction, property development and expressway concessionaires in 2012. Putrajaya Perdana Expressways Sdn Bhd (PPE) (a member of Putrajaya Perdana Berhad), the developer of the expressway, was expected to begin construction of the project in early 2015. The project is expected to take three years to complete.

Features
 There are five toll plazas.
 Act as a bypass for Puchong.

Interchanges

3401 LEKAS Interchange  Kajang-Seremban Highway

Plaza Tol Semenyih

  MyRFID

3402 Bangi Interchange  Jalan Reko

3403 PLUS Interchange  North-South Expressway Southern Route

Plaza Tol Putrajaya 

  MyRFID

3404 Putrajaya Interchange {Putrajaya Ring Road

External links
Putrajaya Perdana Expressway Sdn Bhad (PPE) website
Putrajaya Perdana Berhad (PPB) website
SKIP map alignment
SKIP alignment video

Expressways in Malaysia
Proposed roads in Malaysia